Marc Anton Kyu Hungerbühler (born 1963) is a New York City―based multimedia artist and curator. He was born in Switzerland to a Swiss father and a Korean mother. He has one sister, Cosima Hungerbühler. He received his Bachelor of Fine Arts from the Parsons School of Design in 1985, and went on to a summer residency at the Skowhegan School of Painting and Sculpture. He has exhibited his works in Korea, Japan, China, the United States, and Europe. In 2002, he founded the:artist:network, an independent arts organization based in downtown Manhattan and Beijing, for which he serves as director. For the:artist:network, he has organized and curated more than 40 international exhibitions and established residency programs in New York, Switzerland, and China.

Marc Hungerbühler has served as a cultural correspondent for various Swiss media in New York since 1993. In 1998, he was granted permanent residency in the United States as a foreign professional with extraordinary ability in the arts. He has initiated numerous art-exchange projects, in particular between the United States, Europe, and Asia.  Presently, he is curatorial director for the first 798 Beijing Biennale 2009.

He has been married to Alexandra Hungerbühler since 1995, and they have two children, Noelle and Sebastiao. His sister has a son called Daniel Vicente.

Selected curatorial projects
CRITICAL MASS, Huang Yan Contemporary Art Center, Beijing, China, 2008
Power-Shape, Bridge Art Center, Beijing, China, 2008
SURGE, 798 Art Festival, Beijing, China, 2007

References

External links 
 theartistnetwork.org
 Tagblatt
 Formavision
 TimeOut Beijing
 ArtDaily

Swiss art curators
Artists from New York (state)
1963 births
Living people
Parsons School of Design alumni
Swiss expatriates in the United States
Skowhegan School of Painting and Sculpture alumni